Cechorismenus is a genus of flies in the family Stratiomyidae.

Distribution
Taiwan.

Species
Cechorismenus flavicornis Kertész, 1916

References

Stratiomyidae
Brachycera genera
Taxa named by Kálmán Kertész
Diptera of Asia
Endemic fauna of Taiwan